Münster Zentrum Nord is a railway station located in Münster, Germany.

History

The station is located on the Münster–Rheine line and the Münster–Enschede railway. The train services are operated by Deutsche Bahn and the Westfalenbahn.

Train services
The following services currently call at Münster Zentrum Nord:

Notes 

Railway stations in North Rhine-Westphalia
Railway stations in Germany opened in 1995